A Simple Wish is a 1997 American children's-fantasy-comedy film directed by Michael Ritchie, and starring Martin Short, Mara Wilson, and Kathleen Turner. The film is about a bumbling male fairy godmother named Murray (Short), who tries to prove himself capable by helping a young girl named Annabel (Wilson) fulfill her wish that her father, an aspiring actor, wins the leading role in a Broadway musical.

It was the last film from director Michael Ritchie before his death in 2001. it was a commercial failure and received mostly negative reviews from critics.

Plot
Carriage driver Oliver Greening (Robert Pastorelli) aspires to perform on Broadway and, despite an outstanding audition for a new musical based on A Tale of Two Cities, he loses out to the seasoned Tony Sable (Alan Campbell), as he is considered more bankable and less of a risk than the unknown Oliver.

Later that night, Annabel (Mara Wilson), Oliver's young daughter, doesn't convince her brother Charlie (Francis Capra) that fairy godmothers exist, and after they fall asleep, she awakens to find Murray (Martin Short), a male fairy godmother, in her room. Murray, who is largely treated with disdain for being a man in a female-dominated profession, agrees to grant Annabel's wish that her father get the part so that her family won't have to move to Nebraska, hoping that by doing so he will finally be taken seriously.

Hortence (Ruby Dee), the head fairy godmother, is overseeing the North American Fairy Godmothers Association (NAFGA)'s annual meeting. All participants are instructed to turn in their wands so that no trouble occurs. The sorceress Claudia (Kathleen Turner), who was banished from the NAFGA for her selfish use of magic, sneaks in and uses a curse to turn Hortence into paper. She then steals all the collected wands; Murray arrives late to the conference and doesn't check his wand in, making it the only one she doesn't have.

When Annabel sees Murray accidentally left his wand behind in his rush to make it to the conference, she plans to return it to him, but Charlie breaks it. Annabel manages to glue the broken pieces together and gives it to Murray, only to then wind up in Nebraska after the former botches a spell for instantaneous travel. An angry local threatens them, and Murray tries to turn him into a tiny rabbit but instead transforms him into a giant rabbi. Before the giant stomps on them, Murray casts the travel spell again and they wind up in the Central Park zoo just as Oliver arrives in his carriage with Charlie.

Annabel begs Murray to grant her wish, but he accidentally turns Oliver into a statue. To fix it, the three go to ask Hortence for help, only to find her still under Claudia's curse. While Murray fixes his wand with Charlie's help, Hortence tells Annabel that, in keeping with the rules governing fairy godmothers, she must break Murray's spell by midnight, or her father will be a statue forever. Claudia, meanwhile, realizes that Hortense had secretly given her wand to Murray so as to keep her from regaining her full power.

At the theatre, Annabel asks Murray to try sabotaging Sable's audition. First, he tries to make it rain on the stage, but the weak downpour is dismissed as a simple technical problem and the audition continues. Then she asks him to give Sable a "frog in his throat" to impair his singing. Murray takes this too literally, and frogs start hopping out of Sable's mouth, shocking everyone.

Nevertheless, Sable is given the part as the director refuses to wait for Oliver and wants to get the show into production. Boots (Amanda Plummer), Claudia's dog-turned-human servant, finds them. Murray mentions the story of Brer Rabbit to Annabel and they trick the gullible Boots into taking them to Claudia by begging her not to. Claudia demands that they hand over her wand, and when they both refuse, she resorts to torture by enchanting them to dance as ballerinas for her amusement until they are both completely worn out.

Annabel keeps Claudia distracted while Charlie attempts to give Murray the wand, but Boots manages to grab it. Murray then plays on Boots being unhappy with the way Claudia treats her to convince her that he should have the wand instead of her mistress. Claudia attacks him, but Murray tricks her into casting a spell that traps the evil sorceress within her own magic mirror, which he shatters to keep her imprisoned for eternity.

Murray, Charlie, and Annabel return to Central Park and restore Oliver just in time for him to be given the part of Sable's understudy. To finally grant Annabel's wish, Murray appears backstage and causes Sable to slip on a bucket and twist his ankle. The resulting temper tantrum gets him fired and Oliver, his understudy, takes over. Charlie and Annabel watch the show with Murray and the other fairy godmothers.

Cast
 Martin Short as Murray: The first male fairy godmother.
 Mara Wilson as Annabel Greening: Oliver’s daughter and Charlie’s sister.
 Robert Pastorelli as Oliver Greening: Annabel and Charlie’s father who works as a coachman and dreams of becoming a Broadway star.
 Francis Capra as Charlie Greening: Oliver’s son and Annabel’s brother.
 Kathleen Turner as Claudia: A former fairy godmother who seeks revenge for having her wand taken away.
 Amanda Plummer as Boots: A dog enchanted by Claudia into a human woman, who serves her mistress loyally despite being pushed around.
 Ruby Dee as Hortence: The head of NAFGA.
 Teri Garr as Rena: Hortence’s secretary.
 Jonathan Hadary as Lord Richard: A playwright and director.
 Deborah Odell as Jeri: Oliver’s agent.
 Alan Campbell as Tony Sable: A conceited and arrogant actor.
 Jack McGee as Officer York
 Lanny Flaherty as Duane: A motel owner who lives in Nebraska.

Reception
Reception to the movie was negative, with Pixelated Geek's Cinerina stating that while the movie's jokes might not appeal to adults, the movie would have appeal for a younger audience. Roger Ebert gave the film one and half stars, saying "When family audiences avoid inspired films like The Secret Garden, The Little Princess and Shiloh, why would they choose a pallid exercise like this?" ReelViews and the Austin Chronicle both reviewed the film, with the Chronicle stating that "The concept's good... But this family film about an incompetent fairy godmother named Murray (Short), is shy several handfuls of fairy dust."

The Rotten Tomatoes approval rating is currently 25% based on 16 reviews.

References

External links
 
 
 
 
 
 

1997 films
1990s fantasy comedy films
1990s coming-of-age films
American children's comedy films
American coming-of-age films
American fantasy comedy films
1990s children's fantasy films
Films scored by Bruce Broughton
Films about wish fulfillment
Films directed by Michael Ritchie
Films about witchcraft
1997 comedy films
Universal Pictures films
1990s English-language films
1990s American films